Wojciech Słomka (born 4 November 1998) is a Polish professional footballer who plays as a midfielder for Garbarnia Kraków.

Club career
On 4 September 2020, he joined II liga club Skra Częstochowa on loan.

References

1998 births
People from Brzesko
Sportspeople from Lesser Poland Voivodeship
Living people
Polish footballers
Association football midfielders
Wisła Kraków players
GKS Katowice players
Zagłębie Sosnowiec players
Skra Częstochowa players
Garbarnia Kraków players
Ekstraklasa players
I liga players
II liga players